Churdaf is a rural locality (a selo) in Kuzhniksky Selsoviet, Tabasaransky District, Republic of Dagestan, Russia. The population was 443 as of 2010. There are 3 streets.

Geography 
Churdaf is located 14 km northwest of Khuchni (the district's administrative centre) by road. Kyurek is the nearest rural locality.

References 

Rural localities in Tabasaransky District